"All I Want Is You" is the fourth and final single from Carly Simon's 13th studio album Coming Around Again (1987). The song was co-written by Simon and frequent collaborator Jacob Brackman.

The song is one of Simon's biggest Adult contemporary hits, and has been included on multiple compilations of her work, such as the three-disc box set Clouds in My Coffee (1995), the UK import The Very Best of Carly Simon: Nobody Does It Better (1998), the two-disc retrospective Anthology (2002), the single-disc Reflections: Carly Simon's Greatest Hits (2004), and Sony Music's Playlist: The Very Best of Carly Simon (2014). It is also featured in Simon's 1987 HBO concert special Live from Martha's Vineyard, and the accompanying Greatest Hits Live (1988).

Reception
"All I Want Is You" peaked at No. 54 on the Billboard Hot 100, becoming Simon's 22nd entry on this chart, where it spent nine weeks. It was an even greater success on the Billboard Adult Contemporary chart, where it peaked at No. 7, and charted for five months. It ranked No. 46 on the Adult Contemporary year-end chart for 1988.

Cash Box said that "Simon turns in yet another outstanding vocal performance."

Track listings and formats
7" single (US) 
 "All I Want Is You" (Single edit) – 3:40
 "Two Hot Girls (On A Hot Summer Night)" – 4:51

7" single (UK)
 "All I Want Is You" – 3:58
 "You Have To Hurt" – 4:04

Personnel 
 Carly Simon – lead vocals 
 Andy Goldmark – keyboards, drum machine 
 Robbie Kilgore – keyboards, synth bass 
 Jimmy Maelen – percussion 
 Rob Mounsey – string arrangements and conductor 
 David Nadien – concertmaster 
 Roberta Flack – backing vocals

Charts

Weekly charts

Year-end charts

References

External links
Carly Simon's Official Website

1987 singles
Carly Simon songs
Songs written by Carly Simon
Pop ballads
Songs written by Andy Goldmark
1987 songs
Arista Records singles
1980s ballads
Songs written by Jacob Brackman